The 2016 Chicago Blitz season was the third season for the American Indoor Football franchise, and their second season in the AIF. On May 25, the Blitz cancelled its last scheduled road game and announced that the team was for sale.

Schedule
Key:

Regular season
All start times are local to home team

Standings

Roster

References

Chicago Blitz
Chicago Blitz
Chicago Blitz (indoor football)